Thời sự  (literally, 'Current Affairs'; also known as the News) is the main news program produced by the News Department of Vietnam Television (VTV). First broadcast on September 7, 1970, it is one of the oldest and most watched programs in Vietnam. The program also plays a key role in the work of information, propaganda, and public opinion orientation of the Communist Party of Vietnam, the State and the Government of Vietnam.

Main editions of Thời sự are broadcast live at two timeslots. The midday edition airs at 12:00 daily on VTV1, while the evening edition airs at 19:00 daily on VTV1 and VTV3 and is simultaneously broadcast on most local TV stations and several national TV channels in Vietnam as well. On various other timeslots of the day, shorter editions of the News usually broadcast at the peak of the hour. Programs that have been broadcast can be found on the VTVgo online TV viewing application and VTV digital site.

History 
Before Vietnam Television was born in 1970, news - documentaries was one of the genres produced by Vietnam Film Studio in the form of plastic films. In 1956, the Documentary & News Film Studio separated from the Vietnam Film Studio to formed the Central Documentary and Science Film Studio .

In 1968, the Television Film Studio was established, with the task of producing 16-mm television films to send to foreign television stations to propagate the situation during wartime in Vietnam. Also from that time, foreign television crews were invited and guided to operate and prepare necessary material and technical foundations for the construction of a complete radio-television studio and a radio-television industry to serve the domestic propaganda work in the future.

In 1970, News was one of the first programs in the first experimental television broadcast of Voice of Vietnam. From that day forward, the official genre of television news was born. Since then, News has always been a part of the television program every night, usually starting at 19: 00. Initially, as there was no storage device at that time, the News program was broadcast live, later it had been pre-recorded. News was broadcast after the children's program Little Flowers (similar to the model of the countries of the socialist bloc at the time). In the following period, along with additional broadcasts in the morning (9:00) and afternoon (14:00), news bulletins were also expanded. When the channel VTV2 was formed in 1990, News was broadcast on both channels in the evening broadcast. The 19:00 news program on VTV2 was broadcast for the following years until 2001, when it was no longer broadcast.

In October 1997, the program News began to be  broadcast live to inform the audience with the fastest information, and was broadcast on VTV1 channel at the same time with VTV3 at 19:00 daily. In addition to the main version, there are also Domestic News, International News, broadcast in the morning on VTV1, and the midday news, first broadcast on VTV2 and rebroadcast on VTV3 in the afternoon.

In 2002, along with the expansion of VTV1's broadcast time from 05:30 to 24:00 daily, VTV rearranged its newscasts. At this time, VTV has news at 09:00, 12:00, 16:00, The last news of the day at 23:00 on VTV1; at 19:00 on VTV1 and VTV3 and 22:00 on VTV2.

On October 10, 2003, the News for the Impaired Hearings broadcast its first edition on VTV2 at 22:00. In addition to the image and words of the host from the 19:00 News being rebroadcast, there are also subtitles on the screen that are simplified for hearing impaired people to read. From April 1, 2011, the form of expression was changed to sign language interpretation and maintained until now.

On June 15, 2011, channel VTV1 broadcast 24 hours a day. Along with that, VTV1 has now broadcast teletext-style bulletins updating domestic and international information at the top of every hour from 00:00 to 04:00 every day, with a duration of 10 minutes.

On January 22, 2012, the program News 19:00 was broadcast from the newly invested studio with modern technology at the new Program Production Technical Center (later the Television Center) building of Vietnam Television Since then, VTV has continuously changed the studio and technology until 2015, it has remained stable up to now, with the studio consisting of 01 main virtual screen and 01 secondary LCD screen. Sub-news bulletins at various times of the day were also broadcast interlaced in the following years.

From December 30, 2013, the News at 19:00 has solo anchors.

Main content 
Similar to the news program in other socialist countries like Xinwen Lianbo (新闻联播) of China Central Television or Vremya (Время) of Central Television Station (ORT1 now) of the Soviet Union, the content of the 19:00 News often mentions the visits of foreign politicians, or visits abroad of central leaders, large conferences and forums, public press releases and announcements through meetings of the Party and authorities at all levels, social, economic and political issues, good examples for the government, etc. Many important political news in the country and in the world are also broadcast in this program.

Besides the main content, Thời sự also has sub-sections such as:
Pictures & comments (Hình ảnh và bình luận): Started airing since 2007 every Sunday night, this subsection will summarize the best images and events of the week. This subsection ends on December 26, 2010.
 People ask, Minister responses (Dân hỏi, Bộ trưởng trả lời): Starting from 2012 every Sunday night, the governing ministers in each issue will answer questions sent by the audience/people about the issues being discussed. This subsection has been removed since 2016.
Sports 24/7 (Thể thao 24/7; before 2005 was Sports News/Tin thể thao): Started broadcasting from March 1, 2005, reporting on events and news. updated sports at home and abroad, implemented by the Sports Programs Production Board.
Weather forecast (Dự báo thời tiết): Started broadcasting in parallel with the News, it updating natural disaster situation, temperature forecast, hydrometeorology in the country. Through many stages, from applying graphics for the first time, to having visual presenter (2004), improving content, etc... until now, the Weather forecast has become an indispensable part of the program News.
Impressive images/Images from life (Hình ảnh ấn tượng/Hình ảnh từ cuộc sống): aired daily in the evening News from April 1, 2021, reviewing beautiful images , impressive images of the day or the week.
There are also other subsections such as "Today's Issues", "International Stories", "Economic Information",...

Editions

Edition before 1997 
VTV News before 1997 was broadcast after the program Những bông hoa nhỏ in the morning, afternoon and evening (19:17) daily in a pre-recorded form on VTV1 and VTV2 until September 1997.

Major Edition (since 1997)

News at 19:00 
The main version began to air when VTV3 broadcast the evening program in October 1997, broadcast live at 19:00 daily on VTV1 and VTV3 of the program with sole anchor (from 1997 to December 29, 1997), solo anchors (from December 30, 2013 to present), usually spend most of its time covering important domestic news. The first information in the program is usually the activities of the Party, the State, the National Assembly, the Government...leaders; announce press releases, announcements and meetings of the Government, the National Assembly, and authorities at all levels; speaking on major economic and policy issues. The program also reflects the official positions of the Communist Party of Vietnam on many issues. Then there will be socio-economic information. Other important stories and international news are often placed at the end of the program or interspersed with domestic news (except for important news, which will sometimes be reported earlier). Occasionally the program will also feature a special 5 to 10 minute commentary section devoted to particularly prominent domestic issues, presenting by another editor/correspondent. The 19:00 News is rebroadcast on VTV2 at 22:00, with additional interpretation in sign language for the hearing impaired. 

A program with this structure usually lasts between 40 and 45 minutes. However, on occasions when a major event is taking place, important to the country, the program is sometimes lengthened, possibly up to nearly 120 minutes or more. Currently, the broadcast record of the program is 108 minutes, broadcast on January 26, 2021, covering the opening of the  XIII Congress of the Communist Party of Vietnam.

News at 12:00 (since 2002) 
The 12:00 noon version has only one anchor (only from May 1, 2014 to November 27, 2016 with two anchors), and runs from 20 to 25 minutes (sometimes can last up to 60 minutes or more on occasions when major events are important to the country). Using the main visuals used in the 19:00 version, from December 2016 the show was recorded and broadcast in a virtual studio and the anchor will usually stand instead of sitting like the 19:00 version.

Before 2002, the noon news was broadcast on channel VTV2 at 12:00 and replayed on VTV3 in the afternoon.

News Headlines 
Short version of the News usually broadcast at 08:00, 09:00, 11:00, 16:00, 17:00, 23:00; the compilation version of news being aired during the day airs at about 19:55/20:00 immediately after the broadcast of 19:00 News with a duration of 2 to 15 minutes. This version features a single host when it airs between 08:00 and 23:15, using the same ident and visuals as the 12:00 and 19:00 versions, but shorter and the title is simply known as 'News' or 'Headlines'. For the edition aired 50 minutes apart between 00:00 and 04:10 there will be no anchors, instead, news sections are being reported in the form of pictures and text on the screen, using a short version of the ident with a band of lost birds flying around the Earth in dark tones, followed by the appearance of the words Tin tức (News). Previously, the bulletin had the old name of Short News.

Watch Online 
All news broadcasts during the day can be viewed at VTV's official website and VTVgo app.

Broadcast 
All time frames listed below are local time (UTC+07:00).

Major Edition

Live broadcast 

 VTV1 at 12:00 every day;
 VTV1 and VTV3, VTV Cần Thơ at 19:00 daily;
 On all channels of VTV at 19:00 on Lunar New Year's Eve every year (30th day, full year or 29th day, leap year)
 Simultaneously broadcast on most local television stations of Vietnam, Vietnamese National Assembly Television (Quốc Hội TV), ANTV, Vietnam National Defense Television (QPVN) and paid television channel An Ninh The Gioi (Hanoi Cab 3) at 19:00 every day

Previously broadcast:
 VTV5 at 19:00 daily (until December 31, 2015).
 Relay on channels of Vietnam Cable Television (VTVCab): 
VCTV1 (now Vie Entertainment, until February 28, 2013)
VCTV5 (now E Channel, until October 31, 2012)
VCTV9 (Info TV) (until December 31, 2018)
VCTV10 (now ON Cine, until August 31, 2017) 
VCTV15 - Invest TV (nowON Music, until December 31, 2015)
 Relay on regional channels of Vietnam Television Station: VTV Can Tho, VTV Da Nang, VTV Hue, VTV Phu Yen and VTV9 (until December 31, 2015).
 Relay on VTC Digital Television channels: VTC1, VTC8 at 19:00; replay on VTC9 after 23:00 (until December 31, 2017).

Replay 
 VTV2 at 22:00 every day (except Lunar New Year's Eve), with Sign Language for the hearing impaired.
 THTPCT (Can Tho TV) at 23:00 every day

Top-of-the-hour edition 

 VTV1, under the name News or Headlines at 08:00, 09:00, 11:00, 16:00, 17:00, 19:55/20:00 and 23:00 daily.

Brief content edition 

 VTV1, under the name News at 00:00, 01:00, 02:00, 03:00, 04:00 daily.

Controversy

"6 star flag" problem 
At the news broadcast at 19:00 on October 14, 2011, while reporting on the visit China of the General Secretary Nguyen Phu Trong, suddenly a picture of the National flag of the Communist Party was displayed. People's Chinese flag 6 stars - 1 big star and 5 small stars appeared on the screen. It is known that the current Chinese flag has only 5 stars representing 5 major ethnic groups in China. The big star is for the Han people, the 4 small stars are for the Hui, Mong, Tibetan, and Manchu ethnic groups.

Two days after the above incident, a spokesman for the Ministry of Foreign Affairs of Vietnam, Mr. Luong Thanh Nghi, said that the Department of State Protocol has seriously reviewed, learned from experience and disciplined relevant officials this incident.

Wrong illustration 
On July 5, 2018, many television viewers expressed their displeasure when the weather forecast after the 12:00 News bulletin "transformed" the image of the electric pole fire in Hue City (Thua Thien Hue) into the image of a fire that occurred in Hanoi City.

The cause of the above confusion is that the editor unintentionally put a video clip sourced from YouTube, recording images of a fierce electric pole fire that occurred on Ben Nghe Street, Hue City on the afternoon of the day. 3 July 2018 without verification.

According to many TV viewers, the above incident may be just a mistake, but it is difficult to accept because VTV is a national television station while the program producers work sloppily.

Host

Currently 
 Nguyen Tien Anh (since 2019). Tien Anh first worked at the External Affairs Television Department (VTV4), then moved to the News Department (VTV1).
 Nguyen Huu Bang (since August, 2014). He was born in 1979, started working at VTV since 2006. He used to work for VTV6 channel, then tried to host the program 19h News on VTV1 in 2012, and since then until now. Be the host of this show. He is the most veteran editor of "News" after Quang Minh (Lead from 2000 to 2015), Duc Hoang (Lead from 2005 to 2010) parted ways with television and switched to management. Besides News, he also hosts live TV programs of VTV.
 Nguyen Tuan Duong (since 2016). Tuan Duong used to be the MC of many programs on News and Politics on VTC1 until 2013. In early 2014, he moved back to work at Vietnam Television Station until now. Currently, in addition to 19h News, he also hosts many programs, news and live TV programs of VTV. He received the Impressive Host award at the VTV Awards 2021 - Magical Journey.
 Tran Minh Trang (Khanh Trang, February 2, 2017 - October 31, 2018, July 8, 2019 - February 2, 2020 and September 1, 2020 - present). She was born in 1984, worked for Hanoi Radio and Television Station, and joined VTV in 2014. In 2017, she was assigned the responsibility of leading the 19h News and has been with the program ever since.
 Hoang Linh Thuy (January 1 - April 1, 2020 and from October 29, 2021 - present). She used to host the program 19h News, then temporarily disappeared from the news for more than a year. On October 29, 2021, she suddenly returned to lead 19h News. She is the youngest 19h News MC up to now.
 Chau Phuong Thao (from November 6, 2021): Born in 1986, Phuong Thao has had 13 years of working with television. In 2008, she became an official employee of VTV Can Tho. In 2016, due to work requirements, she moved to VTV Building (Hanoi). In mid-April 2021, she unexpectedly switched to the Weather host. In November, she reappeared in a number of News reports, before officially returning to lead the News from December.
 Nguyen Minh Trang (October, 2018 - 2021 and from March 3, 2022 - now): She used to host the 19h News program, then disappeared from the news for more than 2 years. On March 3, 2022, she suddenly returned to lead the 19h News.
 Tran Quoc Anh (November 1, 2018 - May 30, 2021 and April 19, 2022 – June, 2022 and from December 24, 2022 - present)

News 12:00 
 Minh Khue;
 Van Ly;
 Dan Le;
 Xuan Son;
 Chu Linh;
 Thanh Lan;
 Thuy Linh;
 Ngoc Diep (2013 - ?);
 Viet Hai;

Other

See more 
 List of programmes broadcast by Vietnam Television
 Good Morning (VTV)
 24h Movement News (VTV)
 News program
 Television and mass media in Vietnam

News programs of the same genre 
 Aktuelle Kamera, Deutscher Fernsehfunk, East Germany
 Po sveta i u nas, Bulgarian National Television, Bulgaria
 보도, Korea Central Television, North Korea
 Xinwen Lianbo (Xinwen Lianbo), China Central Television, China
Vremya, Soviet Central Television Station, former Soviet Union (later part of the Soviet Union) TV Channel 1 of Russia).
 Thailand Moves Forward - (Thai Royal News), 28 Thai TV channels

References 

Vietnamese television shows